Leptokalpion is a genus of fungi in the Thelebolaceae family. This is a monotypic genus, containing the single species Leptokalpion albicans.

References

Leotiomycetes
Monotypic Leotiomycetes genera